Paleoctenophora brasseli is a fossil species of ctenophore, found in Devonian slate near the German town of Buntenbach in Hunsrück, Germany, as a member of the Hunsrück Slate Lagerstätte.

Paleobiology
It is approximately 400 million years old. Compared to the other Hunsrück species, Archaeocydippida hunsrueckiana, P. brasseli is poorly preserved. Portions of comb rows are preserved, but the number can not be determined: P. brasseli is assumed to have around 8 rows, based on comparison with the similar-looking modern sea gooseberry genus, Pleurobrachia, from the North Sea. The specimen does show the statocyst, however.

Both specimens of A. hunsrueckiana and P. brasseli are too delicate to be prepared, and all information extracted from them have been done via radiography

Etymology
It is named after the fossil collector Günther Brassel and first documented in Nature magazine in 1983.
The only known example is now in the Bavarian State Collection.

References

 Bartels, C., Brassel, G., Fossilien im Hunsrückschiefer, Dokumente des Meereslebens im Devon, Museum Idar-Oberstein, 7, Seite 63
 Conway Morris, S., Collins, D. H., Middle Cambrian ctenophores from the Stephen formation, British Columbia, Canada, Philosophical Transactions of the Royal Society of London B, 351, 1996, Seite 279
 Otto, M., Zur Frage der Weichtiererhaltung im Hunsrückschiefer, Geol. Palaeont. 28, Seite 45
 George D. Stanley Jr., Wilhelm Stürmer, The first fossil ctenophore from the Lower Devonian of West Germany, Nature, 303, 1983, Seite 518

Prehistoric ctenophore genera
Paleozoic invertebrates of Europe
Devonian cnidarians